The Roman Catholic Diocese of Palayamkottai is a diocese located in the city of Palayamkottai in the Ecclesiastical province of Madurai in India.

History
 17 May 1973: Established as Diocese of Palayamkottai from Metropolitan Archdiocese of Madurai.

Bishops of Palayamkottai
 Savarinathen Iruthayaraj (17 May 1973 – 15 July 1999)
 Jude Gerald Paulraj (23 October 2000 – 29 June 2018)
 Antony Papu Samy - Apostolic Administrator (30 June 2018 - 15 December 2019)
 Antonysamy Savarimuthu (15 December 2019 – present)

Saints and causes for canonisation
 Servant of God Peter Reddy OFS, (Paul Chenappan Reddy or Peter Paradesi)

References

External links
 GCatholic.org
 Catholic Hierarchy
  Diocese website 

Roman Catholic dioceses in India
Christian organizations established in 1973
Roman Catholic dioceses and prelatures established in the 20th century
Christianity in Tamil Nadu